Saulzoir is a commune in the Nord department in northern France.

It is situated on the river Selle and has about 1700 inhabitants (2019). The town was the site of Julius Caesar's battle against the Nervians.

Heraldry

See also
Communes of the Nord department

References

Communes of Nord (French department)